Edimar is a given name. It may refer to:

 Edimar (footballer, born 1986), Edimar Curitiba Fraga, Brazilian football left-back
 Edimar (footballer, born 1987), Edimar Silva Jacomelli, Brazilian football right-back

 Juninho (footballer, born 1999), Edimar Ribeiro da Costa Junior, Brazilian football forward